Robert Braithwaite FLS FRMS (10 May 1824 – 20 October 1917) was an English bryologist. He worked professionally as a general practitioner. He married  Charlotte Elizabeth, daughter of Nathaniel Bagshaw Ward, who influenced him. His best known contributions to bryology were his 3-volume The British Moss-Flora (1887–1905). He served as President of the Quekett Microscopical Club from 1872 to 1873.

He was honoured in Braithwaitea  in 1872 (from the Hypnodendraceae family) which was published in Acta Soc. Sci. Fenn. Vol.10: on page 250 in 1872.

References

External links

 
 

1824 births
1917 deaths
English botanists
Bryologists